The Thyni  were a Thracian tribe that lived in south-eastern Thrace. The Thyni were closely related to the Bithynians, with whom they often exchanged troops and royal marriages, later a section of the Thyni, along with the Bithyni, migrated to the area in Asia Minor that would later be known as and Bithynia, and where they would later be conquered by the Lydian and Persian empires. Each respective region (Thynia and Bithynia) got its name, presumably, from the Thracian tribe that was more prominent in the area. Xenophon (Anabasis VII, 2) praises the Thyni: "Teres, with a large army, was said to have had his baggage train taken from him by the natives, who are called Thyni and are supposed to be the most dangerous of all the tribes, especially at night fighting." The Thyni included clubs amongst their weapons. The Thyni often joined the ranks of organized armies as mercenaries or volunteers.

References

Ancient tribes in Thrace
Ancient mercenaries
Thracian tribes